1989
Soviet
Films